Saratov Airlines Flight 703 was a domestic passenger flight from Moscow Domodedovo Airport to Orsk Airport in Russia. On 11 February 2018, the aircraft serving the flight, an Antonov An-148-100B, crashed shortly after take-off, killing all 71 people on board – 65 passengers and six crew members.

Aircraft
The aircraft involved in the accident was an Antonov An-148-100B built by Voronezh Aircraft Production Association, registration RA-61704, MSN 27015040004, powered by two Progress D-436 engines. It first flew in May 2010 and was delivered to Rossiya Airlines in June 2010. It had been involved in two previous minor incidents in service; an engine was shut down on 28 July 2013 after it surged in flight, and it suffered a nose wheel failure on take-off on 23 August 2013. The aircraft had been leased to Saratov Airlines since February 2017, a year prior to the crash.

Accident

The flight was a regularly scheduled domestic passenger service from Moscow's Domodedovo Airport to Orsk Airport in Orsk, a city near the border to Kazakhstan, operated by Russian regional carrier Saratov Airlines. The scheduled departure time from Moscow was 14:00. Flight 703 took off from Moscow at around 14:21.

Several minutes after taking off from Moscow, the aircraft's speed and altitude started to fluctuate.

The aircraft crashed near the villages of Argunovo and Stepanovskoye in Ramensky District of Moscow Oblast. The accident occurred at 14:27 local time (11:27 UTC), six minutes after take-off from Moscow's Domodedovo Airport. According to a source inside the investigation, a few minutes before the crash the pilot of the aircraft told air traffic controllers about a malfunction, and that he planned to make an emergency landing at Zhukovsky. This report was later dismissed by the investigation committee. Eyewitnesses reported that the aircraft was in flames during its descent to ground. The crash was caught by a surveillance camera in a nearby house. The footage showed that the aircraft slammed into the ground, and immediately burst into flames.

The Russian prosecutor's office launched criminal proceedings for suspected violations of air traffic safety rules. It found reports that the airline had been banned from operating international routes in 2015, and that these had resumed after a change in policy in 2016. The Russian Federal Service for Supervision of Transport (Rostransnadzor) stated that during its examination on the accident aircraft, the airline had violated the procedure for changing oil in the gearboxes, and the procedure for washing the air starter filter.

Passengers and crew
According to the flight manifest, Flight 703 was carrying 65 passengers and 6 crew members. Most of the passengers were residents of Orenburg. The Russian Ministry of Emergency Situations said that all but two of the passengers were Russian citizens. One of the foreign passengers was Azerbaijani while the other was Swiss. Everyone on board was killed. Rescue workers reached the site 2.5 hours after the crash.

The captain was a 51-year-old Russian named Valery Gubanov who had accumulated 5,000 hours of total flying experience, of which 2,800 were on the Antonov An-148, but only 58 hours as pilot in command. His medical certificate had expired two days before the accident.  The Russian first officer Sergei Gambaryan was 35 years old.

Investigation

The Russian Interstate Aviation Committee (IAC) opened an investigation into the accident. President Vladimir Putin also set up a special commission to investigate the crash. Within the first few hours of the investigation, the Ministry of Transport announced two theories regarding the crash – weather conditions and human factors.

The wreckage of Flight 703 was scattered over a wide area. Since a witness stated it was in flames during its descent, a bomb theory was put forward by several investigators. Both flight recorders (the flight data recorder and the cockpit voice recorder) were found on 12 February.

Saratov Airlines' documents related to the aircraft were impounded as part of the routine investigation. The crash has also caused the Russian Emergency Ministry to discuss whether all Antonov An-148s should be grounded temporarily. Personnel at Moscow Domodedovo Airport were also interviewed.

Russian news agency Rambler News Service (RNS) reported that the pilot of Flight 703 had declined to have the aircraft de-iced before the departure.

On 13 February, the IAC reported that initial analysis of data from the flight data recorder showed that the pitot tube heaters were not turned on and there were discrepancies in the airspeeds being displayed to the pilots, with one airspeed indicator showing increasing airspeed, one showing decreasing airspeed and the third showing no airspeed. The data also showed that the aircraft was under manual control when it pitched nose down some 30° below the horizontal and remained in that attitude until it impacted the ground. The first officer tried to stop the sharp descent, but failed to persuade the captain that the plane was out of control.

On 27 June 2019, the IAC reported that the crash, during climb in instrument meteorological conditions, was caused by the crew's erroneous reactions to unreliable airspeed indications caused by ice blockages of all three pitot probes, which led to the loss of control of the aircraft’s flight dynamics resulting in a dive and collision with the ground.

Aftermath
A crisis centre was set up at Orsk Airport, where relatives of the victims were transported. Monday, 12 February was designated as a day of mourning by the Orenburg government. The head of the Ministry of Labour and Social Affairs, Maxim Topilin, stated that all relatives of the victims would be given 2 million rubles (about US$35,000) each. President Vladimir Putin cancelled his planned trip to Sochi in response to the disaster. The government stated that he would coordinate with the special commission he had set up.

On 12 February, Saratov Airlines suspended all An-148 flights as well as all of its flights to Orsk. Saratov Airlines resumed An-148 flights on 16 February after carrying out technical inspections of all An-148s in its fleet. On 20 March, Rostransnadzor suspended all flights by Saratov Airlines after further violations of rules were discovered. On 1 June 2018 Saratov Airlines' air operator's certificate was revoked because of violations of the regulations.

See also

 Air France Flight 447
 Birgenair Flight 301
 Indonesia AirAsia Flight 8501
 2011 Garbuzovo Antonov An-148 crash

 Other aircraft that crashed due to icing leading to loss of control:
 American Eagle Flight 4184
 Comair Flight 3272
 USAir Flight 405
 Air Ontario Flight 1363
 ATI Flight 460
 Arrow Air Flight 1285
 Air Florida Flight 90

References

External links

 Ан-148-100B RA-61704 11.02.2018 – Interstate Aviation Committee – Russian version
 List of passengers and crew of Antonov An-148 flight 6W703 Domodedovo – Orsk  – EMERCOM
 Jet crash in Ramenskoye District, Moscow Region  – EMERCOM

2018 disasters in Russia
Accidents and incidents involving the Antonov An-148
Aviation accidents and incidents in 2018
Aviation accidents and incidents in Russia
February 2018 events in Russia
History of Moscow Oblast
Transport in Moscow Oblast
Airliner accidents and incidents caused by instrument failure